Óscar Christopher Vílchez Soto (born 21 January 1986) is a Peruvian footballer who plays as a central midfielder for Alianza Universidad and for the Peru national football team. He is also the younger brother of footballer Walter Vílchez.

Club career 
He was promoted to the first team of Alianza Lima in 2004 by Gustavo Costas, in that year he made his official debut. He scored his first goal in the Descentralizado on 31 July 2005 in the 4–0 home victory against Sport Ancash. In January 2006 he was loaned out to Sport Ancash for the start of the 2006 season. In January 2007 he was loaned out to Arequipa giants FBC Melgar for the first half of the 2007 season. He returned to Alianza in July 2007 and played several matches. At the end of that year, he suffered an injury that left him outside for nearly 2 years. In July 2009, after having surgery in Mexico and completing his treatment, he was hired once again by Alianza Lima.

Honours

Club
Sporting Cristal
Torneo Descentralizado: 2012
Alianza Lima
Torneo Descentralizado: 2003
Torneo Descentralizado: 2004
Torneo Descentralizado: 2017

References

External links 
 
 
 

1986 births
Living people
People from Chiclayo
Association football midfielders
Peruvian footballers
Peruvian Primera División players
Club Alianza Lima footballers
Sport Áncash footballers
FBC Melgar footballers
Sporting Cristal footballers
Juan Aurich footballers
Peru international footballers
Copa América Centenario players